Sir John Miller Martin  (15 October 1904 – 31 March 1991) was a British civil servant who served as Principal Private Secretary to the Prime Minister, Winston Churchill, during World War II. The position is a public, rather than private post. He was present at the most important strategic conferences and was knighted in 1952.

Early life 
John Miller Martin, born on 15 October 1904, was the son of the reverend John Martin (Church of Scotland). He was educated at the Edinburgh Academy and won a scholarship to Corpus Christi College, Oxford.

Career 
Having passed the civil service examination in 1927 he joined the Colonial and Dominion offices. After a long and distinguished career his final posting was British High Commissioner for Malta in 1965 before retirement in 1967.

He was awarded a Royal Victorian Order (CVO) in the King's Birthday Honours 1943, an Order of the Bath (CB) in the 1945 Prime Minister's Resignation Honours and was knighted (KCMG) in the 1952 New Year Honours.

Personal life 
He married Rosalind Ross, daughter of Sir David Ross, in 1943. The union bore one son. Sir John Martin died on 31 March 1991 at the age of 86.

References

External links 
The Papers of Sir John Martin held at Churchill Archives Centre

1904 births
1991 deaths
British civil servants
Principal Private Secretaries to the Prime Minister
Winston Churchill